Indiana re-elected its member August 3, 1818.

See also 
 1818 and 1819 United States House of Representatives elections
 List of United States representatives from Indiana

1818
Indiana
United States House of Representatives